Brienz is a town in Switzerland

It may also refer to:

Lake Brienz, named after Brienz
Brienz/Brinzauls, a town in Graubünden
Brienz-Surava, a town in Graubünden